The  is the development of Shinto the traditional religion of Japan.

Although historians debate at what point it is suitable to refer to Shinto as a distinct religion,  veneration has been traced back to Japan's Yayoi period (300 BC to AD 300). Buddhism entered Japan at the end of the Kofun period (AD 300 to 538) and spread rapidly. Religious syncretization made  worship and Buddhism functionally inseparable, a process called shinbutsu-shūgō. The  came to be viewed as part of Buddhist cosmology and were increasingly depicted anthropomorphically. The earliest written tradition regarding  worship was recorded in the 8th-century Kojiki and Nihon Shoki. In ensuing centuries,  was adopted by Japan's Imperial household. During the Meiji era (1868 to 1912), Japan's nationalist leadership expelled Buddhist influence from  worship and formed State Shinto, which some historians regard as the origin of Shinto as a distinct religion. With the formation of the Japanese Empire in the early 20th century, Shinto was exported to other areas of East Asia. Following Japan's defeat in World War II, Shinto was formally separated from the state.

Even among experts, there are no settled theories on what Shinto is or how far it should be included, and there are no settled theories on where the history of Shinto begins. The Shinto scholar Okada Chuangji says that the "origin" of Shinto was completed from the Yayoi period to the Kofun period, but as for the timing of the establishment of a systematic Shinto, he says that it is not clear.

There are four main theories.

 The theory that it was established in the 7th century with the Ritsuryo system (Okada Souji et al.)
 The theory that the awareness of "Shinto" was born and established at the Imperial Court in the 8th-9th century (Masao Takatori et al.)
 The theory that Shinto permeated the provinces during the 11th and 12th centuries (Inoue Kanji et al.)
 The theory that Yoshida Shinto was founded in the 15th century (Toshio Kuroda et al.)

Overview 
Although there is no definitive theory on the origin of Shinto as a religion; its origins date back to the ancient history of Japan. Based on rice cultivation introduced at the end of the Jōmon period and at the start of the Yayoi period, nature worship, which views nature as one with some god, arose in the Japanese archipelago. These beliefs were spread throughout the archipelago as a national festival by the Yamato Kingship in the Kofun era. Rituals were held at the first Shinto shrines such as Munakata Taisha and Ōmiwa Shrine, and the prototype of Shinto was formed. In the Asuka period, the ritual system, shrines, and ceremonies were developed along with the establishment of the Ritsuryo, and the Ritsuryo rituals were formed with the involvement of the Diviners as the administrative body. Ritsuryo rituals were formed in which the Department of Divinities The Tang dynasty rituals were used as a reference for the regulations of the management and operation of rituals in the ritual system. In the following Nara period, the Kojiki and the Nihon Shoki were compiled as Japanese mythology along with the national history, and the rituals and the Emperor's family were connected. In the Heian period, the Ritsuryo system was relaxed and the emperor and his vassals became directly involved in the rituals of local shrines without going through the Shinto priests. In addition to this, Shinbutsu-shūgō, a phenomenon of Shinbutsu-shūgō, in which Buddhism was fused with this belief in gods, also occurred in ancient Japan, while the idea of Shinbutsu segregation, in which rituals were distinct from Buddhism, was also seen. In addition, beliefs such as Shugendo and Inmyōdō were established in Japan, and these also influenced Shinto.

In the Middle Ages, there was a widespread movement to doctrinize and internalize Shinto. In the Kamakura period, the Kamakura shogunate's veneration protected shrines in various regions, and among the common people, Kumano, Hachiman, Inari, Ise, and Tenjin came to be widely worshipped across regions. In the midst of this spread of Shinto, the intellectual class began to use Buddhist theories to interpret Shinto, starting with the Esoteric Buddhist monk's dualistic Shinto, and advocated such theories as Honji Suijaku theory, which held that the Shinto gods were incarnations of Buddha. In response to this, the Shinto shrines, feeling threatened, systematized the Honji Suijaku theory, which placed their gods above Buddha, against the backdrop of the rise of Shinto after the victory over the Mongol invaders, and established Ise Shinto, which uses the Five Books of Shinto as its basic scripture. In addition, Yoshida Kanetomo, who lost many ancient books in the Ōnin War of the Muromachi period, took the opportunity to forge sutras to create the first Shinto theory that had its own doctrine, sutras, and rituals independent of Buddhism. Yoshida Kanetomo took this opportunity to create the first Shinto theory, Yoshida Shintō, which was the first Shinto theory to have a doctrine, scripture, and rituals. From the Sengoku era to the Azuchi-Momoyama period, Yoshida Shinto was involved in the construction of shrines that enshrined warring feudal lords as gods.

In the Edo period, which constitutes a large part of the Early modern period in Japan, the Tokugawa shogunate reorganized the administration of shrines, and improvements in security and transportation allowed the common people to visit Ise Grand Shrine Tokugawa shogunate reorganized the administration of shrines, and improvements in security and transportation led to an increase in pilgrimages to Ise Grand Shrine On the other hand, Buddhism, which had attained the status of a state religion, was in a period of stagnation as an ideology. In this context, in the early Edo period, mainstream Shinto, from the standpoint of criticism of Buddhism, became increasingly associated with the Confucianism of the Cheng-Zhu school, and shifted to Confucian Shinto such as Taruka Shinto. In the mid-Edo period, Kokugaku, which integrated Shinto with the empirical study of Japanese classics such as poetry and languages, developed and flourished, replacing Confucian Shinto. The Kokugaku scholar Motoori Norinaga strongly criticized the interpretation of Shinto in terms of Chinese-derived Buddhist and Confucian doctrines, and insisted on conducting empirical studies of Shinto scriptures. In the late Edo period, Nobunaga's theology was critically inherited by Fuko Shinto. Fuko Shinto, influenced by Christianity, emphasized the afterlife, as well as Chinese mythology, Hindu mythology, Christian mythology, and other myths from around the world were claimed to be accents of Japanese mythology, and were involved in the subsequent restoration of the monarchy. On the other hand, in the Mito Domain, the Late Mito Studies, which integrated Confucian ethics such as loyalty, filial piety, and humanity with national studies, was developed in response to the criticism of Nobunaga, who rejected Confucianism. Late Mito studies, which advocated the rule of Japan by the emperor by combining Confucianism and Shinto, became the nursery ground for the ideas of the Shishi at the end of the Edo period.

When the Shogunate was overthrown and Japan began to move toward the Late modern period, the new government set the goal of unity of Shinto and politics through the Great Decree of Restoration of the Monarchy. In addition to the propagation of Shinto based on the Daikyo Declaration, the Shinbutsu bunri led to the separation of Shinto and Buddhism, and in some cases, the Haibutsu Kishaku, the destruction of temples and Buddhist statues. The Meiji government then formed the State Shinto system in which the state controlled shrines as state religious services. Later, when the Separation of church and state led to the expulsion of the ritualists, the theory of non-religious shrines was adopted, which gave shrines a public character by defining them as not being religions, and local shrines were separated from public spending. In response to this, Priests organized the National Association of Priests and launched a movement to restore the power of the Shinto priests, demanding that the government make public expenditures. The Kannushi organized the National Association of Shinto Priests and launched a movement to restore the Shinto officialdom, demanding that the government make public expenditures. After the end of World War II, the Shinto Directive by the GHQ dismantled the state Shinto system, which was considered the root of Nationalism ideology. The Shinto Directive by the State Shinto of the Shinto Directive dismantled the state Shinto system, and shrines were transformed into religious corporations with the Association of Shinto Shrines as the umbrella organization. Although shrines thus lost their official position in modern times, some shrines have since achieved economic prosperity through free religious activities, and Shinto plays a certain role in Japan's annual events and life rituals.

Ancient times

Before the Ritsuryo rituals 
As rice cultivation was introduced to the Japanese archipelago from the late Jomon to the Yayoi period, a belief in nature based on rice cultivation also arose. This belief was based on the idea that nature and the gods were one, and that sacrifices and rituals were performed to prevent the gods from haunting the land in the form of natural disasters. 

During the Yayoi period, a new grave system, the square-shaped tomb, a bronze ritual represented by the Kojindani Ruins, and a large pillar with an independent building common to the later shrine architecture, as in the case of the Ikegami Sone Ruins. Things that are pointed out to be continuous with the shrine, such as large-scale buildings, have been excavated, as well as a wide range of burial bones that burn bones such as deer, and mirrors, swords, and balls are used as secondary funerals. You will be able to see elements that are clearly continuous with the Shinto beliefs found in Yayoi and Nihon Shoki. 

Around the 3rd century, the Mount Miwa in the Yamato region began to host the Suminata ruins, and the Hashibako Kofun and other early large anterior and posterior round burial mounds appeared. Yamato Kingship is thought to have been established around this time. The third century is estimated to be the time when the triangular-rimmed mirror and the iron sword excavated from the Isonokami Jingu at the Kagamisaku-za Amaterasu Shrine were produced. The elements that led to later Shinto beliefs gradually became clearer. 

Later, in the 4th century, the first Shinto state rituals can be confirmed, and at the Munakata Taisha in Fukuoka Prefecture, Munakata City, Okinoshima (Fukuoka) Munakata Taisha in Munakata City Fukuoka Prefecture, a large number of ritual objects, such as bronze mirrors and iron weapons, which are common to burial mounds around Yamato in the late 4th century, have been excavated. In addition, small copper mirrors and other ritual objects consistent with those of Munakata Taisha have been unearthed at Mt. Miwa, and it is highly likely that the rituals at Mt. Miwa, which led to the later Ōmiwa Shrine, began at about the same time as the rituals at Okinoshima.、The second half of the 4th century, when rituals began at the first shrines, Munakata Taisha and Okami Shrine, is thought to be the time when the direct prototype of later Shinto was formed. 

In the 5th century, ritual sites using stone imitations common to rituals in the Yamato region were found throughout Japan, suggesting that rituals of the Yamato kingship spread to various parts of the Japanese archipelago. Particularly in the eastern part of the country, many Haji potterys have been found in the Miyanakajori-Ofunatsu area in Ibaraki Prefecture, Kashima City, and the Kotaki Ryogenji site in Chiba Prefecture, Minamibōsō pottery, high cups, Magatama and other stone imitations have been excavated from the Funatsu area and the Kotaki Ryogenji site in Minamibōsō. The rituals in these areas are thought to be connected to the Kashima Shrine and Awa Shrine, which were later respected by the Imperial Court and were established as Shinto shrines. 

In addition to iron objects, which were buried in burial mounds, Sue ware and woven cloth were also excavated from the Senzodai site in Chiba Prefecture and the Dessaku site in Ehime Prefecture in the 5th century. 

In the 6th century, the funerary rituals of the burial mounds began to change, and a change from vertical to horizontal stone chambers could be seen. The funerary rituals of Kofun burial mounds were established using figurative clay images of people using weapons and armor, beasts as offerings, and horses ridden by nobles. With the change from vertical to horizontal stone chambers, it is presumed that a view of the spirit that separated the body from the spirit was established, and this is thought to have influenced the formation of the personal view of God seen in the Kiki myth.

Formation of Ritsuryo Rituals 

In the 7th century, the Ritsuryo system began to be established in Japan, mainly under the Emperor Tenmu and Empress Jito dynasties, and Shinto underwent a major transformation along with this. Based on the form of beliefs that had been formed throughout history since the Kofun period, and taking into account elements such as foreign beliefs, the development of ritual systems, shrine buildings, and ritual ceremonies progressed, leading to the systematization of Shinto and the administrative organization of rituals.

The public ritual system of the Ritsuryo state was developed based on the Shingi ordinance in the Ritsuryo. The Shingi Code is thought to have been stipulated at the stage of the enactment of the Asuka Kiyomihara Code, and the enshrinement code of the Tang dynasty was used as a reference. The regulations for the management and operation of rituals were followed in the Ritual Ordinance, but the content of the rituals was almost entirely unique to Japan, and it is reasonable to understand that the Ritual Ordinance was a rearrangement of Japan's unique belief in the gods based on the Ritual Ordinance. 

The Diviners was the practical organization for the administration of rituals established based on the Divine Decree, and a directorate called the Diviners' Count was also established. Under the involvement of the Shingi Kan, thirteen types of rituals were established as national rituals to be held seasonally: the Prayer Year Festival, the Jinka Festival, the Shingi Festival, the San-eda Festival, the O-mimei Festival, the Tatsuta Festival, the Tsukiji Festival, the Tsukiji Festival, the Shin-namesai Festival, the Soh-namesai Festival, the Shinten Festival, and the Dai-namesai Festival (Niiname-no-Matsuri). In February of the lunar calendar, a prayer festival is held to celebrate a good harvest, and in March of the lunar calendar, a flower-relief festival is held to pray for the extinction of evil spirits. It is closely related to rice cultivation, such as holding a great harvest festival to pray for the absence of rice, and a Niiname-no-Matsuri festival to thank new grains in November of the lunar calendar. Is a characteristic of the Ritsuryo ritual. Before and after the ritual was held, it was stipulated that a ritual was given to the officials, and in the Ritsuryo ritual, there were two types of rituals, Maimi and Arai. Chisai is to renounce all duties and enter into a state of sanctification and devote oneself solely to the preparation of the ritual, while sansai is to perform duties but not to perform the "Six Colors of the Law. The six prohibitions were: mourning, inquiring about illness, eating shishi (quadrupedal mammals), executing the death penalty and punishing the guilty, making music, and touching defilement. According to the length of the period during which the rituals are performed, the rituals are classified into large, medium, and small rituals. For example, in the case of large rituals (which only applies to the Jenge-Otame-sai), the rituals are performed for one month and three days. 

Among the rituals of the Ritsuryo State, the Prayer Year Festival, the Monthly Festival, and the Dai-namesai Festival used the unique Japanese ritual form of banpei, which could not be seen in other countries. The Nakatomi clan would deliver a prayer of congratulation, and the Saibe clan would distribute woven offerings to the priests, who would then offer them to the gods of their respective shrines. First, the Nakatomi clan presented the emperor with purifying linen, and the Tohan and Saibun clans presented the emperor with purifying swords and said the words of exorcism. Next, the men and women of the 100 government officials gathered in the exorcism room at Suzaku-mon Gate, where the Nakatomi clan read the words of exorcism, and the Turabu clan performed the exorcism. 

Until then, many shrines did not have their own shrine buildings, but around this time, some shrines, especially those recognized as official shrines, began to have their own buildings. In addition, the Shinto hierarchy system was also developed during this period, and shrines that demonstrated spiritual powers were given Shinto seals, Shinto hierarchies, and Shinto ranks, and Shinto counties were established in areas where there were particularly venerated shrines. In addition, some shrines established Kobe and Kanda to support the economic base of the shrine. In the areas that were not recognized as governmental shrines, private rituals continued to be conducted without shrine buildings, and ritualists called haffuri were selected to perform agricultural rituals to thank the gods for rice planting in the spring and harvesting in the fall. 

During this period, the ritual system of the Ise Grand Shrine was also developed, and in the reign of Emperor Temmu, the Emperor of Japan would share a meal with the Amaterasu, facing the direction of Ise. In addition, the system of Saiō, in which unmarried women of the imperial family were sent to the shrine, was established, and in the reign of Emperor Jitō, the shikinen sengu ceremony was started.

Furthermore, Shinto influenced the compilation of national history, which was conceived during the reign of Emperor Tenmu and came to fruition during the reign of Empress Genmei. The national histories Kojiki and Nihon Shoki, compiled in the 8th century, include the story of the Age of the Gods as Japanese mythology and the Emperor Jimmu, which established the emperor as the legitimate ruler of Japan. In addition to this, efforts were made to link old rituals with the goddesses of the emperor's ancestors, such as the assumption that the deities of Munakata Grand Shrine were goddesses created by Amaterasu (the three goddesses of Munakata), and the origins of ritual clans in the imperial court, such as the Nakatomi, Imbibe, and Sarume-kun, were sought in the world of mythology.

The Transformation of Ritsuryo Rituals and Heian Rituals 
In the Heian period (794-1185), the Ritsuryo ritual system was transformed as the Ritsuryo system was relaxed.

In 798 (Enryaku 17), it became impossible to maintain the system of paying money to the governmental shrines throughout the country, and the governmental shrines were divided into two groups: the governmental shrines, which were paid by the Shinto priests as before, and the national shrines, which were paid by the national government. In addition, there was a classification of large and small shrines, with those with particularly great spiritual power being designated as Meishin-taisha. These classifications are summarized in the Enki Shiki Shinmeicho of 927 (5th year of extension). 

In addition, with the growth of the emperor's inner court structure with the relaxation of the Ritsuryo system, a ritual called the public ritual, in which the emperor and his close retainers were directly involved without the involvement of the Shinto priests, and in which the regular rituals of specific shrines with which they had a strong relationship were given a state official character, arose from the late Nara period to the early Heian period. In the Emperor Shōtoku dynasty, Empress Kōmyō and others led the way in making the annual ritual of Kasuga Shrine, which enshrines the deity of the Fujiwara clan, a public ritual. Furthermore, as a result of the extension of the emperor's authority, extraordinary rituals began to be held. Extraordinary rituals are rituals to specific deities other than the regular rituals, and are performed by the emperor directly by dispatching a ritual messenger. The first example of this was the Kamo Temporal Festival, which was held based on an oracle received by Emperor Uda in the Emperor Uda dynasty, and was called the Temporal Festival, including those that became regular later. 

During the reign of Emperor Uda, when the ascension system was established, the rituals in which the emperor and his close retainers were directly involved were further expanded. In addition, the Emperor Suzaku's reign was the first time that the most dignified emperor-appointed ritual, the Gyokko, took place. In the past, the emperor stayed in the palace and dispatched messengers to the shrine, but in the gyoko, the emperor goes directly to the shrine and dispatches messengers from there, which is an unprecedented form of ritual. 

The Kogo Shūi, in which Saibu Hironari describes the traditions of the Saibu clan (Imaibe clan) and opposes the Nakatomi clan, and the Kujiki, which summarizes the traditions of each clan and is thought to have been created by the Mononobe clan. The Kogo Shūi and is thought to have been created by the Mononobe clan, and the Shinsen Seijiroku, an official compilation of the origins and traditions of each clan, were also created. The clans were classified into three groups: "Shinbetsu clans", which were linked to the Shinto dynasty, "Imperial clans", which were branches of the Imperial family, "Shobans", which had origins in foreign countries, and "Undecided miscellaneous clans", whose origins were unknown. 

The Engishiki was completed in 927 (5th year of extension), and volumes 1 through 10 of the Engishiki were devoted to Shinto-related laws and regulations. These ten volumes are collectively referred to as the "Shinto Shiki," with volumes 1 and 2 describing the upper and lower portions of the Four Time Festivals, volume 3 the Extraordinary Festivals, volume 4 the Ise Grand Shrine, volume 5 the Saiku Dormitory, volume 6 the Saiin Dormitory, volume 7 the Jenzoin Taisho Festival, volume 8 the Shukushi, and volumes 9 and 10 the Shinto Names. 

In addition, since it was no longer possible to maintain the offerings to the Meishin Taisha, special offerings were made to the most revered of these shrines, the Prayer Grain Offering, which later evolved into the 16 Shrine Offering, and was added to from time to time, converging into the 22 Shrine System. The offering of money to the twenty-two shrines continued until 1449 (the first year of the Houtoku Era) in the late Middle Ages. 

In local rituals, the Ichinomiya system developed, in which dispatched Kokushi set the order of shrines to be worshipped in each country by ranking the domestic shrines. The shrines that the national priests worshipped at were compiled into the National Shinto Directory, and later, Sōja, which combined the two shrines and below into one, could also be seen.

Shinbutsu Shugo and Shinbutsu Bunri 

After the official introduction of Buddhism in the 6th century, Buddhism began to spread to Japan through the struggle between the Monobe clan and the Soga clan over the acceptance of Buddhism. However, in the beginning, Buddhism was adopted in the same way as local Shinto and was not recognized as qualitatively different, for example, Buddha was called "Adashikuni no Kami" and women such as Shima, daughter of Shiba Tatsuru, became ordained priests and managed Buddhist statues like Miko. Later, in the 7th century, Japanese gods were also regarded as beings like Devas who, like humans, were seeking liberation. Jingū-ji were built within shrines as facilities for sutra reading before the gods. An early example of this is the Tado Jinguji Temple at Tado Shrine, which was built as a result of Mangan. In addition, temples began to approach Shinto, and the Good God theory, in which gods are regarded as protectors of Buddhism, arose, and Jinja was established in temples. 

In the Heian period (794-1185), the Goryo faith, which had elements of both Shinto and Buddhism, was introduced.and the Kumano faith, which regards Kumano as the Pure Land.Under the influence of Buddhist statues, statues of gods also began to be created.  

As time progressed, the idea of Shinto-Buddhism syncretism developed further, giving rise to the "Honji Suijaku theory" that deities were temporary manifestations of Buddha to save sentient beings, and led to the use of Buddhist deities such as bodhisattvas and gongen, and the creation of gojotai, in which the image of Buddha, the original deity, was engraved on the back of a mirror, which was the deity itself 

On the other hand, the idea of segregation of the Shinto and Buddhist faiths became apparent in the Imperial Court and the Shinto Shrines. According to the "Teikan Rituals" and "Rituals," central and Kinki officials were forbidden to conduct Buddhist rituals during the period of the "Dai-namesai," and it was forbidden for priests and nuns to attend the "Chu-jei" or small rituals involving the "Saikai" in the inner sanctum, and it was forbidden to conduct Buddhist rituals in the inner sanctum. From the middle of the Heian period (794-1185) onward, the emperor himself was required to abstain from Buddhist rituals in the inner sanctum and officials were required to abstain from Buddhist rituals during the Saikai period. At the Ise Jingu Shrine, "buddha" was replaced by "chuko" and "priest" by "haicho" in the shrine grounds. Thus, while Shinto-Buddhist syncretism proceeded on a faith basis, Shinto and Buddhism existed as separate ritual systems.

Establishment of Shugendo and Onmyoudou 
Around the Nara period, Yamanaka, who had never set foot in Japan since ancient times, began to become a training ground under the influence of various factors such as esoteric Buddhism, onmyodo, and Shinto worship. By the end of the Heian period, such mountain ascetic practices were organized, and such mountains as Kinpusen, Kumano Sanzan, Three Mountains of Dewa, and Mount Togakushi, Kumano Sanzan, Three Mountains of Dewa, and Mount Togakushi are considered representative sacred mountains, and Shugendo was formed. Later, Shugendo schools were established, including the Honzan school, which is affiliated with the Tendai sect, the Tōzan school, which is affiliated with the Shingon sect, the Haguro school, which is based in Dewa Sanzan, and the Hidehikozan school, which is based in Mount Hiko 

During the Heian period, the Onmyodo was also established in the imperial court. Onmyodo was originally developed in Japan based on the Yin-Yang Five Elements theory imported from China. The establishment of Yin-Yang-Do also influenced Shinto, and rituals such as the Great Exorcism and the Dao Feast Festival, which had been performed by the Shinto priests, came to be performed as rituals of the Yin-Yang-Ryo. The Great Exorcism (Nakatomi Exorcism), which had been performed by the Nakatomi clan, was changed to the "Nakatomi Ritual Text" and was used by the Yin-Yang Priests. The difference between the two is that the Nakatomi exorcism is in the form of a proclamation, while the ritual text is in the form of a performance. However, while Shinto rituals were national in nature, Yin-Yang-Do was practiced by aristocrats as their demands for worldly benefits increased, such as getting rid of plague and achieving success in life. From the 10th century, Yin-Yang dormitories were passed down from generation to generation, led by the Abe and Kamo clan.

Middle Ages

The Shogunate's Shinto System 
With the establishment of the Kamakura shogunate, the shrine system under the shogunate was reorganized. Minamoto no Yoritomo, the founder of the shogunate, was a great admirer of Shinto and relieved Ise Grand Shrine of its Shinto domain. In particular, it has been pointed out that successive shoguns made it a tradition to pay homage to Izu-Hakone Nisshogongen every January, leading to the current Hatsumōde. Also, in 1194, the Temple and Shrine Magistrate was established. The Kamakura Shogunate, which inherited the reverence of Minamoto no Yoritomo, enacted Oseibai-Shikimoku in 1232 (the first year of Jōei), stating in Article 1 that "shrines should be repaired and rituals should be performed exclusively" and that "gods increase their dignity through the reverence of people, and people add to their fortune through the virtue of gods. The gods shall increase their power through the respect of people, and people shall be blessed by the virtue of the gods. In addition, the "New Kanto System" issued by the shogunate contains various restrictions on Shinto rituals at shrines and the cessation of disorderly conduct by Shinto priests. In the Muromachi period (1336-1573), the Chiaki family succeeded to the position of prayer magistrate. 

After the rise of the Shogunate, however, their duty was to liaise with the Shogunate and seek its approval. In addition, visits to the Kumano Grand Shrine by the emperor became more popular during the Insei period. As the authority of the Imperial Court declined with the establishment of the Shogunate, the Court became more aware of the importance of Shinto rituals, and Juntokuin stated in his book, "Shinto rituals first, other rituals later.

Common People's Beliefs in the Middle Ages 
In the Middle Ages, there was a change in the Shinto beliefs of the common people. In the Middle Ages, however, spiritual deities were Bunrei across regions, and the number of Bunrei-type shrines that prayed for the good fortune of individuals increased. 

In particular, the following have become widely worshipped: Kumano, Hachiman, Inari, Ise, and Tenjin. Kumano was originally thought to be the other world in the mountains where the spirits of the dead went, but with the popularization of the idea of Shinto-Buddhist syncretism, Kumano came to be thought of as the Pure Land that appeared in this world, and the home of the Hongu Taisha Shrine also came to be thought of as Amitābha. People came to Kumano Taisha Shrine to pray for the death of the next life and for personal benefits in this life, and it became known as the "Kumano pilgrimage of ants. In the Imperial Court as well, there were many visits to Kumano by emperors during the Insei period. Yawata was also revered as the guardian deity of the Emperor Seiwa, as Ishimizu Hachimangū had been consecrated from Usa as the guardian deity of Emperor Seiwa, and Seiwa Genji. Minamoto no Yoshiie had Tsurugaoka Hachimangū built in Kamakura. When Minamoto no Yoritomo established the Kamakura Shogunate, Gokeijin throughout Japan who followed the Kamakura Shogunate also prayed to Hachiman in their own territories, and the Hachiman faith spread throughout the country. Inari was originally the clan deity of the Hata clan, but in the Heian period (794-1185), Inari was revered as the guardian deity of Toji, and was combined with Dakini to spread throughout Japan as a deity of agriculture. In the Fushimi Inari-taisha, the first day of the first month of the lunar year, many common people would come to the shrine to pray. The first day of the first month of the lunar year is the time when the gods of the mountains descend to the villages to become the gods of the rice fields in the Tanokami faith. 

However, after the Middle Ages, when Ise Jingu lost its economic foundation under the Ritsuryo system, the Goshi (priests) took the lead in actively proselytizing and offering private prayers to manors across the country in order to collect the first payment and construction costs. The Kumano faith also contributed to the expansion of the Ise faith, as many people began to visit the Ise Shrine on their Kumano pilgrimage, as they would always pass through the Ise Road. In the Kanchakuki of the Kamakura period (1185-1333), on the occasion of the relocation of the outer shrine in 1287 (Koan 10), it was written, "I don't know how many tens of millions of pilgrims there are," and many ordinary people began to visit Ise Shrine. 
 by the common people. In the Goryokai, the portable shrines are paraded from the time they are welcomed into the city to the time they are returned to the city, and it was believed that this would increase the spiritual power of the shrine. In the case of the parade of portable shrines, the residents of Kyoto prepared the Ootabisho and conducted the festival, so there was little official involvement of the Imperial Court, and the festival was a common people's festival with an extremely high degree of originality and place of the residents of Kyoto. By the middle of the Heian period (794-1185), other festivals were established in Kyoto, including the Kitano Goryo-kai, Matsuo Matsuri, Imamiya Matsuri, and Inari Matsuri. 

In each manor, the autonomy of the villages increased, and a miya-za was formed to organize the festival. The miya-za was led by old men called otona and nenyori, and young men were in charge of the rituals. In addition, the shrine became a spiritual center for the villagers. The villagers also visited the shrine in their daily farming life, and the annual guardian of the shrine was chosen from among the villagers in turns.

Theorizing Shinto and the Honji Suijaku Theory 
In the intellectual class, there was a widespread movement to doctrinize and internalize Shinto. The first example of this is the Shingon Buddhism monk Naruson's 11th-century , in which he writes that Amaterasu and Dainichi Nyorai are one and the same, and that Japan is an appropriate place for the spread of esoteric Buddhism. 

Thereafter, Buddhist monks began to visit Ise Shrine one after another, including Chōgen in 1186 (Bunji 2). The first of these was probably "Sankaku Kashiwa Denki" and "Chuushin Horaikunka". In these books, the inner and outer shrines of Ise Jingu are placed in the esoteric realms of taciturnity and vajrayana, and the two shrines are regarded as a mandala that appeared on earth.、Amaterasu is Brahma, the Sun Goddess, and Toyoukebime is Brahmā, the Moon Goddess. Later, the Reiki was compiled and became a collection of secret theories based on Shingon esotericism and a representative book of both Shinto 

In addition, as Shinto calligraphy and related paper were established at temples, Shinto schools of the Ryobu Shinto sect were formed to transmit these calligraphies, including the Sanpo-in Goryu school, whose founder was Prince Morikaku, and the Miwa school, which developed at Byodoji Temple around Mt. In these schools of Shinto, the transmission of the secrets of the Shinto religion was carried out in a manner similar to esoteric Buddhism, and this was called Shinto perfusion. 

Not only from the standpoint of Shingon Buddhism, but also from the standpoint of Tendai Buddhism, a Shinto theory based on the idea of Shinto-Buddhist syncretism arose. The basic idea is to explain the significance of Hiyoshi Taisha, the guardian deity of Mount Hiei, based on Tendai doctrine, and this is called Sanno Shinto. 

In the 13th century, "Yotenki" was written, and it was believed that the Omiya (West Main Shrine) of Hiyoshi Taisha was a manifestation of Shakyamuni as the Great Myojin to save sentient beings in Japan, a small country with a low level of law. Furthermore, in the 14th century, Yoshigen wrote "Yamaga Yosyoki," in which he claimed that not only the main shrine but also all the seven Sanno shrines were manifestations of Buddha. Later, Gigen's disciple, Mitsumune, wrote the "Keiran Kibyoshu" and systematized the doctrine by linking all Tendai doctrines to the Sanno, and stated that the Sanno Myojin is something that people have in their hearts. In addition, in line with the popular Tendai-Hongaku thought that sentient beings have already attained enlightenment without practice, this book also advocates the anti-Honji-Suijaku theory that the Japanese deities who are close to sentient beings are the true land, and that Buddha is a manifestation of the deities. The theory of Shinto in the Tendai sect was mainly carried out by a group of monks called the Kike. 

In the late Kamakura period, Tōdai-ji, or Nanto (Nara), a hanging scroll called the Sanja oracle was established. This is an oracle of Amaterasu, Hachiman, and Kasuga Daimyojin, in which the doctrines of honesty, purity, and compassion are written in Chinese style. The reason why these three shrines became the object of worship in particular is because of the belief that the three gods, Amaterasu, the ancestor god of the emperor, Hachiman, the clan god of the warrior clan (the Seiwa Genji), and Kasuga, the clan god of the court nobles (the Fujiwara Genji), were bound by a mystical pact in the Kamakura period, and that it had been decreed since the Kamakura period that the emperor, the warrior clan, and the court nobles would cooperate in politics in this world. 

In the Middle Ages, with the spread of the idea of Shinto and Buddhist syncretism, shrines began to produce a large number of auspicious stories, and many shrine auspicious stories and auspicious picture scrolls were produced. The "Kasuga Gongen Genki", the "Kitano Tenjin Enki", and the "Hachiman Gudokun" are prominent examples, and the "Shinto Shu", which was established in the 14th century, contains a collection of such tales. It is thought that such tales were created in order to receive reliable patronage from the warrior class as the Imperial Court declined in the Middle Ages. Medieval mythology, which reinterprets myths based on the syncretism of Shinto and Buddhism, also spread.

In the Jōdo Shinshu, Zonkaku wrote a book entitled "Shōjin Honkaishu" in which he divided Japanese shrines into "Gonja" (shrines with Buddha as their head temple) and "Jitsuja" (shrines without Buddha as their head temple), and argued that only "Gonja" should be revered. In Nichiren Shoshu, Nichiren himself actively adopted Shinto, and it was systematized in the form of Hokke Shinto by Nichiren's disciple Nichizō. The idea is that if the righteous laws based on the Lotus Sutra, as advocated by Nichiren, are correctly practiced, then the thirty Japanese deities, led by Atsuta Myojin, will take turns protecting Japan for one day. Other schools, such as Toki-shu, Rinzai school, and Sōtō, have also accepted the Honji Suijaku theory based on their own attitudes.

Shinto-Buddhist doctrine and Shinto-kuni consciousness 
On the other hand, the Shinto shrines, while being influenced by foreign religions such as Buddhism, began to internalize the doctrine of Shinto. With the collapse of the Ritsuryo system, a strong sense of crisis arose among the Shinto forces, which began to shake the foundations of their existence, and they began to describe Shinto rituals with a mystical authority. The background to this is that the Shinto side tried to assert the position of Shinto against Buddhism. In addition, the rise of Shinto thought after the Japanese victory in the Mongol invasions of Japan and the increase in the authority of Ise Shrine due to the increase in the number of Jingu Mikuriya throughout Japan also served as a background for the formation of systematic Shinto theory. 

The pioneering example of this is Ise Shinto, which was established in the mid-Kamakura period. Ise Shinto is a Shinto theory that was formed mainly by the Tukai clan, the outer shrine officials of Ise Jingu, with the "Five Books of Shinto" as its basic scriptures. The five books of Shinto are the basic scriptures. Among the five books of Shinto, "Wahime no Mikoto Seiki" and "Zou Ise Nisho Taijingu Houbei Ki" were established relatively early, and they attempted to make the inner and outer shrines equal in rank, and even to make the outer shrine superior to the inner shrine, while using the theory of both the inner and outer shrines in Ryoubu Shinto. In these books, Toyouuke, the deity of the Outer Shrine, was compared to Amamegonakushi as the root deity that precedes Amaterasu, and the Inner Shrine was designated as the fire deity and the Outer Shrine as the water deity. Five Elements Theory, the outer shrine was given priority over the inner shrine based on the "water over fire" principle. In addition, the mother of Ninigi-no-Mikoto, Manhata Toyokutuzhi-hime, was positioned as a grandson of Toyoke no Mikoto, and Toyoke no Mikoto was incorporated into the line of descendants. In addition to the theory of rituals, he emphasized the idea of the divine nation by preaching the imperishable nature of the imperial lineage, the dignity of the three sacred treasures, and the nobility of the Shinto shrine. 

The impetus for the further development of Ise Shinto was the "Ise Grand Shrine Controversy" that arose in 1296 (Eijin 4th year) when the character "Emperor" was added to Toyokei Daijingu. After taking up the above-mentioned books as the basis for the legitimacy of the outer shrine, Yukitada Tokai, who became the center of the outer shrine, said, "The biography of the Emperor Ise Grand Shrine" and "The book of the Emperor Toyokei Shrine" were written, and the book of Ise Shinto was expanded to the world. 

He systematized Ise Shinto by writing "Ruiju Shingi Hongen" (The Origin of Shinto), which drew on a wide variety of texts, including those of the Sung school, Laoshou, and Buddhism, as well as his own Shinto doctrine called "Kikizenron. In addition to systematizing the Ise Shinto religion, he also taught a unique Shinto doctrine called "Kikizenron," which refers to the state of chaos before the creation of the world as "Kikizen," and states that this is the source of our mind and the essence of God.It is the practice of maintaining cleanliness as a way to make the most of this opportunity. 

Later, Toke Tsunemasa appeared and argued that the Inner Shrine had served the Outer Shrine before it was enshrined in the Outer Shrine, thus equating the Inner Shrine with the Outer Shrine. 

In the North and South dynasties, Kitabatake Chikafusa, influenced by Ise Shinto, wrote Shōtōki Kitabatake Chikafusa, who was influenced by the Shinto religion, wrote Shōtoki and Gengenshū, in which he argued for the supremacy of Japan as a divine nation, since the Japanese imperial line had been continuous since the Shinto era and had never been replaced. During the same period, the Tendai monk Jippen, influenced by the Ise Shinto religion, wrote "Gyojimoto Ki Gengi," which presented the image of the Emperor as a sovereign and established the political theory of Shinto. The nobleman Ichijō Kaneyoshi also wrote the "Nihonshoki Sosho" (Compilation and Commentary on the Chronicles of Japan), in which he interpreted the Nihonshoki Shinto scrolls philosophically and formed Shinto thought. Masamichi Imawabe wrote "Kuchikubetsu" (The Secrets of the Divine Age Scrolls), in which he described Shinto theology through his commentary on the Divine Age Scrolls of the Nihon Shoki.

Formation of Yoshida Shinto 

During the Ōnin reign, the Ōnin War broke out and Kyoto was burnt to the ground, affecting many temples and shrines, and causing the abortion of imperial court rituals such as the Ōnin Festival and the coronation ceremony. One of the priests who was shocked by the upheaval was Yoshida Kanetomo. Kanetomo, who was so upset that he lost his own Yoshida Shrine to the war, as well as more than a dozen residents of the area around the shrine. However, the loss of many ancient manuscripts due to the war led to the formation of a new Shinto theory called Yoshida Shinto. 

The Yoshida family, whose surname is Turabu, was a family that specialized in Ketu (divination) in the Ministry of Divine Worship and succeeded to the position of Deputy Minister of Divine Worship for many generations. In the Middle Ages, Kanekata Urabe became well versed in the study of the Chronicles of Japan, writing Shaku Nihongi, and was called the "House of the Chronicles of Japan. 

Kanetsu wrote "Shinto Taioi" and "Onna Shinto Meibyo Shu" to compile medieval Shinto thought, while incorporating discourses from various religions to present a new Shinto theory called "Yoshida Shinto". In the book, he classified Shinto into three categories: "Honjaku Enki Shinto" (auspicious signs handed down from shrine to shrine), "Ryobu Nariai Shinto", and "Motomune Sougen Shinto". He stated that the "Motomune Sougen Shinto" handed down by his family was the legitimate Shinto since the dawn of Japan, and defined God as "the spiritual head of heaven, earth and all things" and the Way as "the origin of all things and all actions". With regard to the relationship between Shinto, Confucianism and Buddhism, he strongly advocated the theory that Shinto was the root, Confucianism emerged as a branch and leaf in China, and Buddhism blossomed as a fruit in India. 

He argued that Shinto has three aspects: "body," which is the essence, "aspect," which is the manifestation, and "use," which is the action, and that these actions govern all phenomena such as the sun and moon, cold and heat, and nature. In the end, Kaneku's theory of Shinto was a kind of pantheism in which God exists within all beings, and God is omnipresent throughout the universe. Kaneku formed many rituals along with his Shinto theories. First, he established the Omotoshae Shrine in the precincts of Yoshida Shrine, which he proclaimed to be the place of worship for the Inner Shrine, Outer Shrine, eight temples, and more than 3,000 Shinto shrines, the root of Shinto rituals in Japan since the time of Jimmu, and the main shrine of all Shinto shrines in Japan. In addition, under the influence of esoteric Buddhism, he invented the Goma event, in which a fire is kindled in an octagonal platform with a furnace at its center, and grain and porridge are thrown into the fire while praying, forming the San-dan event along with the 18 Shinto events and Sougen Shinto events.

These teachings were expounded by the "Three Nerves" of the Tengen Shinhen Shinmyou Sutra, the Local Shinto Shinmyou Sutra, and the Jingen Shinryoku Shinmyou Sutra. These sutras were said to be the teachings of Tenji-Yane, but these three sutras are fictitious and there is no evidence that they were ever produced. Kanetu forged sutras similar to these by posing as the authors, such as Kamatari Nakatomi, to create his own sutras. The history of the sanctuary was also created by Kaneku himself. 

Yoshida Shinto also established the ritual of Shinto funeral rites, in which people are worshipped as gods. Since ancient times, Shinto has not been very involved in funeral rituals due to the custom of viewing death as Stain, and examples of enshrining deceased people as gods were limited to forms such as grudge worship and Tenjin worship to appease grudges. However, in Yoshida Shinto, where people and gods are considered to be closely related, funeral rituals were actively practiced, and Yoshida Kento built a Shinryu-sha, a spiritual shrine, over the remains of the deceased. 

Although Yoshida Shinto was an emerging force, it rapidly rose to prominence, perhaps due to the social unrest of the age of war, and was widely accepted, especially by the upper classes, as it received the support of Hino Tomiko in the construction of the Omoto Shrine, and even received the imperial approval of the Omoto Shrine in 1473 (Bunmei5).、The center of the Shinto world in modern times. On the other hand, we have received strong protests from the shrines of both domestic and foreign shrines at Ise Shrine. 

Yoshida Shinto is the first Shinto theory to have its own doctrines, scriptures, and rituals independent of Buddhism, while integrating various religious discourses in a cross-border manner.、The Shinto scholar Okada Chuangji described the establishment of Yoshida Shinto as "a turning point in the history of Shinto.、The historian Toshio Kuroda argues that the establishment of Yoshida Shinto was the establishment of ShintoIt is considered by several researchers to be a turning point in the history of Shinto.

As mentioned above, Yoshida Shinto, which established Shinto funeral rites, became involved in the construction of shrines that enshrined warring feudal lords as gods in the Warring States period, and Kanemi Yoshida was involved in the construction of Toyokuni Shrine, which enshrined Toyotomi Hideyoshi as a god. Shinryuin Bonshun of the Yoshida family taught Shinto to Tokugawa Ieyasu, and according to his will, conducted a Shinto funeral service after Ieyasu's death.(However, Nikkō Tōshō-gū became the Sanno Shinto style after Tenkai won the debate).

Early modern times

Restoration of the Shogunate's Shinto System and Imperial Rites 
When the era of warfare ended and the Edo period began, the administration of shrines was reorganized. The shogunate first relieved each shrine of its current territory and granted it the privilege of "not entering into the custody of the guardian. However, what was granted was the right to make profits from the shrines, and the ownership of the land belonged to the shogunate. The Shogunate also established the Jisha-bugyō as a position reporting directly to the shogun, and placed it at the head of the three magistrates, surpassing the Town Magistrate and Account Magistrate under the jurisdiction of the Rōchū. In addition, a Shinto department under the jurisdiction of the temple and shrine magistrates was established to study the truths of Shinto and the rituals of rituals and to respond to the advice of the temple and shrine magistrates.On the other hand, individual magistrates were assigned to specific shrines, such as Yamada bugyō, who was in charge of Ise Shrine, and Nikko bugyō, who was in charge of Nikko Tōshō-gū. 

In 1665 (the fifth year of the Kanbun), the shogunate issued the Priest Law for Priests of Various Shrines, which stated that ordinary Priests without rank must obtain a Shinto license issued by the Yoshida family before they can wear a hunting robe or crown, giving the Yoshida family control over almost all priests. However, it was approved that those families that had been conferred ranks by the Imperial Court through transmission, such as the Jingu Shrine, Kamo Shrine, Kasuga-taisha, Usa Jingū, Izumo-taisha, and Fushimi Inari-taisha, would continue to use the same methods as before, without the Yoshida family. In addition, the law stipulates penalties for neglect of duties by priests, prohibition of sales and purchases of shrine property, and the obligation to repair shrine buildings.

As for funerals, the shogunate enforced that funerals be held at dannaji temples in conjunction with the creation of the sect's personnel register, and people were obliged to hold Buddhist funerals. In this case, the shrine, not the temple, proved that the Christians were not Christians, so it was called "Shinto Shinto Shinto" instead of "Temple Shinto. 

The Shogunate also financially supported the partial revival of the imperial rituals that had been suspended due to warfare. After 222 years of interruptions since Emperor Go-Tsuchimikado, the Dai-namesai was revived in the reign of Emperor Higashiyama, and became a regular event since Emperor Sakuramachi. The Niiname-no-Matsuri was also revived in 1688 (the first year of Genroku), the year after the restoration of the Dai-namesai. In 1744 (the first year of Enkyo), some of the votive offerings were also revived, including those to Kami-Shichisha and to Usa Hachiman Shrine and Kashii Shrine. The Imperial Court's dispatch of imperial envoys on the occasion of the Shinnamesai festival was revived in 1647 (the fourth year of the Shohoho) by the special order of Gokomei. The ceremonial relocation of the Ise Jingu Shrine was also suspended, but was rebuilt during the Orifuji administration thanks to the efforts of Seisun and Shuyou of Keikoin. The Department of Divinities, which was destroyed by fire during the war, was replaced by the eight temples at the Yoshida Shrine, and the Divinities themselves were not rebuilt. 

The Shogunate also imposed restrictions on Shugendo, and in 1613 (Keichō18) issued the "Shugendo Hōdō," which stated that yamabushi must belong to either the Tōzan or Honzan sects, and forbade those who did not. The latter played a leading role in folk beliefs such as Koshin-do.

Popular beliefs in the early modern era 

After the early modern period, with the restoration of public safety and the improvement of transportation conditions, such as the construction of Kaido roads and the formation of Shukuba-machi, the belief in Shinto became more widespread among the general population. People formed associations called "kou" in various places, and each member of the association would accumulate a small amount of money every year, and with the joint investment, a representative chosen by lot would make a pilgrimage to a shrine and receive a bill for all the members of the association. Hongū Sengen Taisha, Kotohira-gū, Inari, and Akiba-kō, which were widely distributed throughout Japan. Each group formed a relationship with a master or a predecessor, and the master arranged for the members of the group to stay overnight when praying or visiting the temple. 

In particular, the belief in Ise Shrine spread explosively during the Edo period. When people visited the shrine, they were welcomed at their own residences, where they performed Kagura (Shinto music and dance) and were treated to sake, Ise delicacies, and quilts. He also took them on a tour of the two palaces and places of interest, making them long to visit Ise. As a result, the common people's belief in Ise has increased, and millions of common people have visited Ise Jingu all at once. It has exceeded 90%. 

As the general public became more active in visiting shrines, many guides were published. These included Edo meisho zue by Gekisen Saito, Namiki Gohei's Edo shinbutsu ganken juhouki, and Okayama Tori's Edo meisho e kagarenki, which catalogued and introduced temples and shrines throughout Japan. In addition, Jippensha Ikku's Tōkaidōchū Hizakurige, which depicts the unusual journey of a pilgrim to Ise, and Comic books called "Hizakurige monogatari," which were written in response to this hit, and other literature on the theme of pilgrimages to shrines and temples were also published in the early modern period, contributing to the spread of Shinto faith among the general public. 

On the other hand, with the secularization of visits to shrines and the increase in the number of visitors, there were not a few cases where entertainment facilities such as Yūkaku, private prostitutes, theaters, and Imitation began to line up around shrines and in their precincts. 

In addition to the increase in the number of shrine visitors, urban commoners' festivals also became more active as a large number of spectators other than Ujiko and worshippers began to participate. [In Edo, the Sanno Matsuri of Hie Shrine, the Nezu Matsuri of Nezu Shrine, and the Kanda Matsuri of Kanda Shrine, also known as the Three Great Festivals of Edo, developed, with the procession of tasteful market stalls and floats, and a costume parade of the Korean envoys and feudal lords, which attracted many spectators. Outside of Edo, many urban festivals were revitalized, such as Gion Matsuri and Imamiya Matsuri in Kyoto, Tenjin Matsuri in Osaka, Hiyoshi Sanno Matsuri in Shiga, Chichibu Yatsuri in Saitama, and Takayama Matsuri in Gifu. Some of these festivals have been handed down since before the early modern period, but many of them were newly restarted after the restoration of public order in the early modern period. 

In the former case, the lord would assign the townspeople to do town work, such as building roads and breeding horses, and would have them participate in the festival by pulling things. In the latter case, a headman was selected from each town, and the headman shared the expenses, or the expenses were shared from the expenses of the town that provided the headman. Although the lords issued thrift ordinances and other regulations for festivals, they generally allowed freedom. 

As mentioned above, the spread of Shinto beliefs to the common people during the Edo period gave rise to a large number of lecturers who taught Shinto to the common people in an interactive manner. Zanchi Masuho, a priest of the Asahi Shinmei Shrine, was one of them. He gave oral talks on the streets with a clever joking tone, and instead of the academic Shinto that sought its basis in the Shinto scriptures, he quoted freely from the legends of Shinto, Confucianism, Buddhism, and the three religions, and attributed Shinto to matters of the heart and practice. In this way, he preached common morals such as harmony between husband and wife and equality between men and women, and he also preached the essence of Shinto, which was to work hard in accordance with one's status, in order to meet the demands of common people living in a status society. 

These Shinto scholars' efforts to educate the people influenced the emergence of popular Shintoists in later periods. Shoshitsu Inoue, a priest of the Shinto shrine in Umeda, started the Misogi Doctrine and gained many followers by teaching the art of "shofar," the law of eternal life, and chanting "three kinds of exorcism" to entrust the safety of one's body to the Shinto light, but the shogunate suspected him and sent him to Miyakejima. Kurozumi Munetada, a priest of Imamura Shrine, also founded Kurozumikyo, which taught that everyone was one with Amaterasu without discrimination of status, and spread to a wide range of people. 

Ishida Baigan, the founder of Shingaku, the largest school of popular education in the early modern period, was also influenced by Shinto scholars in his youth. He emphasized the concept of "honesty", a virtue of medieval Shinto, and harmonized the teachings of Shinto, Confucianism, and Buddhism to teach ideas for the people and merchants. 

In the late Edo period, Ninomiya Sontoku also spread the idea of virtue, based on the principles of sincerity, hard work, decentralization, and compromise, to the people as the "great way of the dawn of creation" and the "great way of Shinto" since Amaterasu opened the reeds field and made it the Land of Mizuho. He harmonized the three religions of Shinto, Confucianism, and Buddhism with Shinto at the center, likening his learning to "a grain of Shinto, a grain of Confucianism, and a grain of Buddha.

The establishment of Confucian Shinto 
During the Edo period, while Buddhism took its place as the state religion under the Terashi system, ideologically it stagnated as a whole.In the world of thought, it was effective as an ideology to support the Shogunate system. In the world of thought, Confucianism, especially Cheng-Zhu school, which was effective as an ideology to support the shogunate system and preached human ethics compatible with the secularism of the Edo period, flourished very much, while Buddhism was criticized by Confucians for its worldliness that was incompatible with secular ethics. Buddhism was criticized by Confucians for its worldly ethics. 

The mainstream theories of Shinto also shifted from Shinto and Buddhism to Confucian Shinto, which was more closely linked to Confucianism. Although there were theories of Shinto advocated by the Yangmingism school, such as Nakae Tōju's Taikyō Shinto, most of the theories of Shinto were formed by Shūji. Although Confucian thought was also incorporated in the idea of Shinto, Confucian Shinto differs in that it explicitly criticized Buddhism and attempted to escape its influence. On the other hand, the logical structure of the Confucian Shinto inherited a strong medieval esoteric tradition, and the Buddhist theory of Shinto-Buddhist syncretism was replaced by the Shuko theory, which can be said to be in a transitional period between the medieval and early modern periods. 

The pioneer of Confucian Shinto was Hayashi Razan. In addition to spreading his knowledge of Zhu Xi to Japan, Razan also studied Shinto, and wrote such works as "Shinto Denju" and "Honcho Jinja Ko", forming his own theory of Shinto called Rituji Shinto. The idea was that the Confucian god Li was the same as the Shinto god, and that the ultimate god was Kuni-Tokotachi. While advocating Shinto and anti-Buddhism, claiming that Japan was pure and superior before the introduction of Buddhism, he also claimed that Emperor Jimmu was a descendant of Taihaku based on Chinese thought, and that the Imperial Regalia of Japan, claiming that the Three Sacred Treasures represented the three virtues of Confucianism, and tried to appeal to the high level of Japanese civilization by claiming that Japan has belonged to the Chinese sphere since ancient times. In addition, the essence of Shinto is a political doctrine that has been handed down from Amaterasu to successive emperors, and rituals at ordinary shrines and festivals for common people were dismissed as "toshu-zuyaku Shinto" and mere "actors. 

In the case of Yoshida Shinto, Yoshikawa Tadashi, a merchant, was initiated into the Yoshida family, and was granted the "Shinto Dotosho" by Hagiwara Kanetsugu, the head of the Yoshida family, and became the official successor. He formed Yoshikawa Shinto, which removed Buddhist discourse from Yoshida Shinto and incorporated more Confucian teachings. His philosophy was that Shinto is the source of all laws and that Kunitokotachi-no-Mikoto presides over the world, and that the world and human beings are created by "truth," which is the same as God. However, because the clarity and wisdom of the Divine Light is clouded by the contamination of the human mind, it is necessary to return to the original form through tsutsumi. And as a concrete way to do this, he taught that we should perform purification to purify the inside and outside, express our sincerity by performing ritual rites, and pray to the gods. In addition, the Confucian view of the Five Luns is that God has given man a mission, and that the relationship between sovereign and vassal is the most important. 

In Ise Shinto, the late Ise Shinto, which excluded Buddhism and incorporated Confucianism, was formed in the Edo period by Nobuka Deguchi, a Shinto priest. The essence of Shinto, he wrote, is the way that Japanese people should naturally conduct themselves in their daily lives, the "way of daily use," which is to perform one's duties with honesty and purity of mind. He pointed out that it is a mistake to think that only the rituals at shrines, such as chanting congratulatory prayers and holding ball-shaped sticks, are Shinto. In addition, he criticized the use of Confucianism and Buddhism for the purpose of learning, arguing that although all religions are ultimately the same, and there are many points of agreement between Shinto and Confucianism, the systems and customs of each country differ, and therefore Japanese people should respect the laws and customs of Japan. However, he also stated that it is okay to study Confucianism and Buddhism as long as Shinto is placed at the center. He argued that prohibiting Buddhism and Confucianism because of their harmful effects and destroying current customs is against the natural order of things and is different from Shinto. 

These Confucian theories of Shinto were compiled by Yamazaki Ansai. After making a name for himself as a Confucian scholar, he was taken in by Hoshina Masayuki, Lord of the Aizu Domain, where he came into contact with Masayuki's guest teacher, Yoshikawa Tadashi, and learned Yoshikawa Shinto, leading to the creation of his own Taruka Shinto.
The idea was to combine Seven Generations of the Divine Age with the Neo-Confucianism of the Shuzi school, and to believe that Kunitokotachi-no-Mikoto was the Taiji, and that the five gods that arose after him were Five Elements, and that the last two, Izanagi and Izanami, combined the Five Elements to give birth to the land, gods, and people. The spirit of the god who created the people resides in each person, and the gods and people are in a state of union called "the only way of heaven and man. He said that Shinto means that people should live according to God, and that people should pray to God to obtain blessings, but that people must be "honest" in order to do so, and that "respect" is the first thing to realize this "honesty. The relationship between the sovereign and the vassal is not one of rivalry or power, but one of unity, and the sovereign and the vassal have protected the country through their mutual protection.、He also had a great influence on the later philosophy of the Emperor.

After the death of Yaksai Yamazaki, his pupil Shoshinmachi Kimimichi succeeded him, and the Taruka Shinto sect reached its zenith, spreading throughout the country, especially in Edo and Kyoto, widely spreading among nobles, warriors, and priests, and having the greatest influence on the Shinto world. After the death of Masamichi, his disciple, Masahide Tamaki, succeeded him and organized the single, double, triple, and quadruple mysteries based on the "Mochijusho" written by Masamichi, and worked on the organization of the Taruka Shinto. Some people, such as Gousai Wakabayashi, criticized this move to make the teachings secret, saying that it would obscure Yaksai's true intentions. 

In addition to the Tachibana family Shinto mentioned above, the Hakka Shinto and Tsuchimikado Shinto were organized under the influence of the Taruka Shinto.

Yoshimi Yukikazu, who was one of Tamaki Masahide's pupils, wrote a book entitled "Goubu-shosetsu-ben" in which he criticized Ise Shinto and Yoshida Shinto by arguing that the Shinto Goubu-shosetsu was a fake book from the Middle Ages, and also criticized Taruka Shinto, which also used the Goubu-shosetsu as its scriptures. In fact, after Masahide Tamaki, Taraka Shinto began to stagnate ideologically and surrendered its mainstream position to Kokugaku. 

In conjunction with these anti-Buddhist ideological trends, a movement to separate Shinto and Buddhism began to spread in some of the clans that had accepted Confucian Shinto. In the Mito Domain, Tokugawa Mitsukuni investigated the history of shrines with strong Shinto-Buddhist practices in 1696 (the 9th year of the Genroku), and organized them in such a way as to wipe out the Buddhist flavor. In addition, Masayuki Hoshina of the Aizu domain carried out a similar reorganization of temples and shrines. In addition, Ikeda Mitsumasa of the Okayama Domain promoted the return of priests from the Nichiren-shū Fuju-fuse and Tendai and Shingon sects, reducing the number of temples and encouraging Shinto funerals. In 1647, Matsue Domain, under the leadership of Matsue Domain lord Matsudaira Naomasa, Buddhist elements were removed from the Izumo-taisha

Development of Kokugaku 
In the mid-Edo period, Kokugaku began to flourish in place of Confucian Shinto. The origin of Kokugaku can be traced to poets such as Kinoshita Naganjako, Kise Miyuki, Toda Shigekazu, Shimokawabe Nagaryu, and Kitamura Kiigin, who composed poems that rejected the medieval norms of poetry in the early Edo period. Qi Oki worked hard on the study of the national scriptures while moving from temple to temple, and left behind such achievements as the empirical study of poetry and Study of Kana Spelling by writing such works as "Manyo Dai Shouki" and "Waza Shouransho", and established the method of empirical study of the classics rather than reading and interpreting them in the style of Confucian and Buddhist doctrines. 

He was succeeded by Kada Harumitsu. Harumitsu was born into the Higashi-Hagura family, who were priests to the Fushimi Inari Taisha shrine, and later moved to Edo to give lectures. Although there is no evidence that Harumitsu was directly apprenticed to Qi Oki, there are many books by Qi Oki in Harumitsu's collection, including "Manyo Dai Shouki", and his own commentaries on the Man'yoshu, such as "Man'yoshu Hokuanshou", mostly follow Qi Oki's readings.He was greatly influenced by Qi Oki. As can be seen in the Sogakusei, Shunman had the intention of organizing history, yushoku-nijitsu, and theology as a school under the name of wagaku, and in Shunman, Shinto and language studies (by Qi oki and others) were integrated as "Kokugaku". 

Kamo no Mabuchi was born into a branch of the Kamo clan, who were priests at the Kamo Shrine, and studied under Kunitokazu Sugiura, a student of Harumitsu. After Harumitsu's death, Mabuchi's fame as a scholar of Japanese literature increased, and he was recommended by Kanda Zaisan to Tayasu Munetake. Mabuchi also studied the Man'yōshū, and as part of this, he also studied the Shūshū, writing and annotating "Man'yōkō", "Kanjikō", and "Shūshūkō". In "Kokuyi-kou", he presented a diagrammatic methodology that extends from the study of ancient words to the study of ancient meanings and ancient ways.、Anti-Confucian ideology and respect for ancient Japan was given to Kokugaku. In contrast to Confucianism, which brought strife to the world by preaching humanity, the Japanese of the Kamidae period had an upright mind that converged on the "two kashikomi" of "God" and "the Emperor," and society was naturally harmonious without the need to preach humanity. However, the content of the ancient path is only fragmentarily described by Mafuchi in contrast to Confucian ethics.、He also taught that it was consistent with Laozhuang Thought, and did not go so far as to derive a system of thought directly from the classics to develop systematic theology. 

After Mabuchi, Motoori Norinaga succeeded Mabuchi and became a great scholar of Japanese literature. He was born into a merchant family, and while studying medicine, he became interested in Japanese classics and waka poetry, and worked hard on his studies of Japanese literature while practicing medicine. 34 years old, he met Mabuchi for the first time in his life and became his teacher, and continued to study under him until Mabuchi's death. At the age of 34, he had the only meeting with Mabuchi in his life and became his teacher. He also developed the aspect of Shinto theology in Kokugaku. He also criticized the Confucian idea of Mandate of Heaven, in which "Heaven" always supports the saints to be Son of Heaven, as a way for those who have taken the country and become kings to justify themselves. On the other hand, Japan has not taught like Confucianism or Buddhism since ancient times, but even if there is no clever teaching, the grandson of Tensho Omikami will squeeze the country, and the world will be settled without being disturbed from top to bottom. He argued that there was a true way in Japan that he couldn't say one by one, saying that it had been transmitted, and that the reason was that there was never a change of dynasty in Japan, whereas in China where there should be Confucian teachings, what? He mentioned that the prince was murdered and the dynasty was replaced. He strongly criticized Buddhist and Confucian Shinto, which interpreted Shinto in accordance with Buddhist and Confucian doctrines. 

He also criticized the science of Zhu Xi, which teaches that the world is created by yin and yang, and the spirit of reason, as an empty theory created by the sages based on their own speculation. He also criticized Lao Zhuang Thought, which describes heaven and earth as "the way that comes naturally.、He argued that all events in the heavens and the earth are governed by the Shinto gods, and that the evil that exists in the world governed by the gods is the work of the evil god Mazutsunichi. He took mythology as fact, and developed the theory of agnosticism, which states that attempting to interpret the workings of the heavens and the earth through logic, as in the theory of rikki, is a form of disrespect for the gods and is beyond the scope of human knowledge. 

Fujiya Goketsu criticized Nobunaga's theology on the grounds that the words of waka poems and myths should be understood as scriptures rather than facts, because they are different from everyday language, which is imbued with the spiritual power of Kotodama, and therefore seem to refer to one thing but refer to another He was also criticized for his theology by Moribe Tachibana and Harumi Murata.

From the time of Nobunaga onward, each individual in the field of Kokugaku specialized in his or her own field of study. Nobutomo Ban, Motoori Ōhira, and Motoori Haruniwa inherited the linguistic and philological aspects of Nobunaga. On the other hand, Hirata Atsutane, who became a disciple of Nobunaga as a "posthumous student" of Nobunaga, focused mainly on the aspects of the old ways and theology.

Restoration Shinto and Late Mito Studies 
In the late Edo period (1603-1868), society began to undergo major changes, such as the repeated attacks by foreign ships, and a new Shinto philosophy was born in the midst of these social conditions.

Hirata Atsutane, who met Honcho Motoi in a dream and called himself a "posthumous student," wrote major works such as "Shinbashira of the Spirit," "Koshiden," and "Honkyo Gaiben," and developed a new philosophy called "Restoration Shinto" while critically inheriting the theology of Motoi Nobunaga. His philosophy emphasized the afterlife, declaring that "the first thing to solidify the Yamato spirit is to know the whereabouts of the spirit," and that the present world was "a temporary world in which Okuninushi keeps people alive to determine their good and evil.
 Atsutane believed that the universe is composed of three elements: heaven, earth, and Hades. He rejected the Shinto theory that "when a person dies, he goes to Hades," and claimed that when a person dies, his spirit goes to the "underworld" presided over by Okuninushi God in "earth," where he is judged by Okuninushi God for his deeds before his death.
 The Underworld is the world of the Emperor of Japan under the Sanka-Shinka, the presiding deity of the world, relative to the Kenmei-Kai, which is ruled by the Emperor of Japan, and is presided over by the Okuninushi.
 This theorized the ancient Japanese view of the spirit, and became the theoretical basis for the Shinto funeral ritual.
 He also argued that all national myths, ranging from Chinese mythology, Indian mythology, and even Christian mythology by Adam and Eve, are "accents" of Japanese mythology, representing the same facts in different words.
 It is believed that Christianity has greatly influenced him in terms of his presiding deity character and judgment after death.
 Although Atsutane severely criticized Buddhism in his "Deeding Laughing Words" and other works, he also criticized Confucianism in his "Gyokusuki" for "not knowing the ancient ways and only listening to Chinese theories," but he affirmed the ethics of Confucianism itself. In contrast to Nobunaga, who mainly criticized Confucianism in his theory of ancient ways, Atsutane's main enemy was Buddhism rather than Confucianism, as he manifested the religious nature of national studies. 

Thus, Hirata Atsutane departed from the positivistic research of Nobunaga and presented a Shinto theory that contained many religious elements. For this reason, he was criticized by Motoori Ōhira, Ban Nobutomo, and other contemporary scholars of Japanese studies under Suzuya. On the other hand, the theology of Hirata Atsutane was handed down to many of his students, and Hirata school Kokugaku scholars such as Okuni Takamasa, Yano Gendo, Maruyama Sakuraku, Gonda Naosuke, and Fukuha Mishizei were responsible for the restoration of the monarchy and the formation of Shinto policies in the early Meiji period.
 

In addition, there was another force that began to emerge at the end of the Edo period. It is Late Mito Studies. To begin with, Mito-gaku is an academic discipline that originated in the Mito Domain, where Tokugawa Mitsukuni began compiling the Dai Nihonshi. The early Mito school, which developed until about the 18th century, was a Confucian discipline characterized by a view of history based on the Shuhistory project and Shuko-logic theory of cause and effect, led by Azumi Tanto, Sasamune Jun, Kuriyama Kofo, and Miyake Kanran.
 In the 19th century, with the emergence of various internal and external problems such as pressure from the powers and the decline of the Edo shogunate, he began to integrate national studies with the studies accumulated in the early Mito school, and to make active proposals to realpolitik by describing social thought.
 This style of study, known as late Mito studies, was pioneered by Fujita Yutani, a disciple of Tachihara Suiken, who was influenced by the study of the Baku school, and was further developed by his students, Fujita Toko and Aizawa Seishisai. In the Kodokan Descriptive Essay, Toko began with Japanese mythology and arrived at the idea of the rule of Japan by an emperor with a lineage of ten thousand generations, rejected the "liberalization" and "Zen domination" of dynastic changes in China, and introduced the three dynasties of the Xia dynasty, Shang dynasty, and Zhou dynasty, which were regarded as sacred in Confucianism. Zhou.
 At this point, Confucianism is no longer an absolute position in Mito studies.
 However, he also made criticisms of national studies, and Toko criticized Nobunaga for taking the position that Confucian ethics were contrary to humanity, arguing that Confucian ethics, such as loyalty, filial piety, and humanity, had existed uniquely in Japan since heaven and earth.
 He also sharply criticized the practice of Shinto and Buddhism as destructive of the national identity, but highly praised the effectiveness of Buddhism as a means of indoctrinating the people.
 

Following this, Aizawa Shoshisai wrote "Shinron" to express his ideas. In order to counter Christianity as a means of invasion and to maintain Japan's independence, Shoshisai proposed a theory of national government in which Amaterasu had successive emperors rule over the country, and people from all walks of life were involved in some way in the governance of Japan while maintaining the status of sovereign and vassal.
 He then integrated the Confucian ethics of "loyalty" and "filial piety" by explaining that since people's ancestors had served the emperor as his vassals for generations, when they served the emperor in the same way, they were carrying on the work of their ancestors and realizing "filial piety" toward their ancestors.
 He also explained that the ritual to confirm the unity of the emperor and the people was the Dai-namesai.
 Furthermore, Shoshisai incorporated Confucianism into his interpretation of Shinto mythology. He claimed that the "Divine Decree of the Immortality of Heaven and Earth," which is found in the "Nihon Shoki" (Chronicles of Japan), in which Amaterasu ordered Qioniongine to rule the country from generation to generation by the descendants of the Heavenly Founder, was the beginning of the "loyalty of sovereign and vassal," and that the "Divine Decree of the Preservation of the Treasure Mirror," in which the Yatagami mirror was ordered to be enshrined as the divine body, was the beginning of the "filial piety of parents and children," which is one of the five principles of Shinto.
 He believed that this was proof that humanity had been established in Japan since ancient times, and he linked Shinto with Confucianism.

The late Mito school became the nursery ground for the ideas of Yoshida Shōin and other leading figures at the end of the Edo period.

Modern and Contemporary

Restoration of the Monarchy and the Divine and Buddhist Decrees 

In 1867 (the third year of Keiō), the Great Decree of the Restoration of the Monarchy was issued. This was drafted by the Kokugaku scholar Tamamatsu Misao, who was a brainchild of Iwakura Tomomi, and it set forth the philosophy of "the founding of the Jinmu". The government first emphasized Shinto with the goal of unity of ritual and government and pro-emperor government, and revived the Shingi Kan to be an organization along with the Grand Council of State. The position of "missionary" was assigned to the Shinto priest, and based on the Daikyo Declaration, the Shinto religion was propagated. In addition, on March 28 of the following year, the Shinbutsu bunri ordinance was issued, ordering priests who had been involved in shrine rituals in the form of Bettō and shrine priests to return to the priesthood and become priests, the abolition of Buddhist deity titles such as Mahabodhisattva and Gongen, and the transfer of Buddhist objects such as Buddhist statues and pagodas within the shrine to other temples. However, lower-ranking officials of the Meiji government who were influenced by the Hirata School of Kokugaku, which had a strong anti-Buddhist ideology, as well as Shinto priests and some people who had antipathy toward the temples that had been dominant under the temple-contractor system in the Edo period, expanded the interpretation of the decree to include radical Abandonment of Buddhism On June 22, the Meiji government issued the "Notice that the Separation of Buddhism and Shinto is not the Abolition of Buddhism", calling for a halt to the Abolition of Buddhism, and in 1871 (the fourth year of the Meiji), it enacted the "Important Cultural Property", and the Abolition of Buddhism began to subside. 

Shugendo and Onmyodo  were also abolished, and with the abolition of Onmyoryo in 1870, Onmyoji became a private religious figure, and Shugendo was abolished in 1872, and Shugendo became a private religious figure or belonged to either the Shingon or Tendai sects 

In addition, the Modern system of ranked Shinto shrines was introduced, referring to the ancient system of shrine rankings, and each shrine was officially ranked. The governmental shrines were divided into two groups: governmental shrines, which were given official status, and other shrines. Ise Jingu Shrine was placed at the top of these three ranks of shrines. As for the various shrines, they were divided into prefectural and prefectural shrines, which were to be respected by the residents of the prefectures, township and village shrines, which were to be respected by the residents of the villages, and unranked shrines, which did not fall under any of these categories, and each was placed under the jurisdiction of the local commissioner. 

The development of the ritual system also progressed, and in 1875, the Shikibu Roudatsu "Shrine Rituals" was established, unifying the rituals of shrines throughout Japan for the first time. Under this law, the number of visitors and the ceremonial order of each shrine festival were determined, and the order of the opening of the doors, offering of food, offering of money, performance of congratulatory prayers, worship of sacrificial offerings, withdrawal of money, withdrawal of food, and closing of the doors were finalized. In 1907 (40th year of Meiji), the Ministry of Home Affairs issued the "Etiquette for Shrine Rituals and Events" to unify the etiquette of each shrine ritual. In addition, in 1914, the Imperial Ordinance No. 9, "Order on Rituals at Shrines under Government National Shrines," was promulgated, and shrine festivals were divided into three categories: Grand Festivals (Prayer Year Festival, New Year's Festival, Regular Festivals, Relocation Festival, and Temporary Offering Festival), Medium Festivals (New Year's Day Festival, New Year's Festival, New Year's Day Festival, Emperor's Day Festival, Meiji Day Festival, and other festivals with a special history at the shrine), and Small Festivals (other). In addition, as a detailed regulation, the "Rituals of Shrines under the Government National Shrine" was established. The "Imperial Household Ritual Order" and its supplementary formulas were established for the Imperial Household Rituals, and the "Jingu Ritual Order" and "Jingu Meiji Rituals" were established for the Jingu Rituals. The Emperor's accession to the throne, accession rituals, the First Rice Festival, and the Rite of the Crown Prince were determined by the Tengoku Order and the Rite of the Crown Prince.

Formation and Development of State Shinto 

In 1871 (the fourth year of the Meiji), a notice in the Grand Council of State Proclamation No. 234 defined shrines as "state religious services. Based on this, the way of shrines and Shinto in the pre-modern era was drastically changed, and a system in which shrines were controlled by the state, the so-called State Shinto, was formed. 

At the beginning of the Meiji Restoration, the Hirata school of Kokugakusha was at the centre of the government, and the unity of ritual and politics and the nationalization of Shinto were promoted, but Ito Hirobumi, Iwakura Tomomi, and other important government officials of the open-minded faction began to aim for separation of church and state, and Tamamatsu Misao left the government in 1870 (Meiji 3) in conflict with Iwakura. In the following year (1871), Yano Gendo, Gonda Naosuke, Tsunoda Tadayuki, Maruyama Sakuraku and other Shintoists of the unity of ritual and government were arrested and expelled simultaneously in connection with the Two Lords Incident. 

In 1875, the freedom of religion was guaranteed, and in 1882, the Ministry of Home Affairs issued a notice defining shrines as non-religious. This was a change from the original policy of aiming for a government based on Shinto with unity of ritual and government, and the theory of non-religion of shrines was adopted. The Meiji Constitution enacted in 1890 (Meiji 23) also did not include any mention of Shinto. After the abolition of the hereditary system of the Shinto priesthood, which was regarded as a "state religion," on the grounds that it should not be occupied by a single family, the state trained the priesthood and decided on their appointment, in the same way as officials (civil service). Since Shinto shrines were considered non-religious, the Shinto priests of the official national shrines were prohibited from engaging in religious activities, including involvement in Shinto funeral rites and the propagation of Shinto doctrine. For this reason, the shrine Shinto that existed before the early modern period, such as Yoshida Shinto and Ise Shinto, also disappeared as a force. In 1871 (Meiji 4), the "Shinto shrine territory decree" was promulgated, which collects all the land of shrines and temples except the precincts. 

In 1871, the Department of Divinities was downgraded to the Ministry of Divinities, a ministry of the Grand Council of State, and in 1872 (1872), the shrine administration was integrated into the Ministry of Religion, which had jurisdiction over religious administration in general. The Ministry of Religion introduced a system of teaching positions to inculcate a spirit of patriotism and respect for the emperor among the people through the joint efforts of Shinto priests and Buddhist monks called Kyodo Shoku, but this system was quickly dismantled due to opposition from both the Shinto and Buddhist sides. Only the "Sanjo Kyoshoku," which outlined the teachings of patriotism and respect for the Emperor, was allowed to be propagated in the teaching position, and the spread of Shinto and Buddhist teachings and doctrines was prohibited. After the dissolution of the Ministry of Religion, the Shinto priests and others established the Bureau of Shinto Affairs to continue their activities. A controversy arose over the establishment of the Bureau of Shinto Affairs over whether or not Okuninushi should be added to the temple. In 1890, Kokugakuin, an educational institution established in the Office of Japanese Classics Research, later developed into Kokugakuin University, a Shinto university. On the other hand, Kogakukan, which was also established in 1882 within the shrine's Hayashizaki Library by order of the Jingu priest, later became another Shinto university, Kogakukan University. 

In 1877, the status of Shinto priests was changed to that of non-officials, and in 1879, public spending on Shinto shrines was cut off.(The payment of salaries from public funds to the Shinto priests had already been discontinued in 1873. In 1887, the government introduced a system of public funds for the preservation of government-owned shrines, and it was decided that public funds would be paid for the next 10 years, but after that, public funds would no longer be paid. 

As mentioned above, in 1871, the "Shrine and Temple Supremacy Decree" was issued, which caused economic damage to shrines and temples. As a result, Shinto shrines suffered more economic damage than temples, which were expected to generate income from funerals and religious activities、and shrines were placed in a very difficult economic position throughout the Meiji period.

In the Meiji era, there were also Yasukuni Shrine to enshrine those who died in the service of the nation, Minatogawa Shrine to enshrine Kusunoki Masashige of the Southern Dynasty, Prince Moriyoshi of the Southern Dynasty, Kamakura-gū, and Kikuchi Taketoki, and many other shrines have been built to enshrine people who have contributed to the nation. 

On the other hand, the Meiji government enshrined a large number of shrines. The number of shrines decreased from 190,000 to about 130,000 as a result of the reorganization of local shrines and unranked shrines that were closely connected to the community. This was opposed by naturalist Minakata Kumagusu and folklorist Kunio Yanagita.

Deity Revival Movement 
While the Shinto shrines were being cut off from public spending, the Shinto priests organized the National Shinto Priests' Association and launched a movement called the Shinto Priests' Restoration Movement, which demanded that the government restore the Shinto priests, arguing that the government should be responsible for providing a budget for the state's religious services. As a result, in 1894, the "Law Concerning the Shinto Priests of Prefectures and Subordinate Shrines" was issued, and the Shinto priests of prefectures and subordinate shrines were given the status of officials who were appointed by the local commissioner. In 1896, the House of Representatives passed the "Resolution on the Restoration of the Ministry of Divine Worship", but the restoration of the Ministry of Divine Worship itself was not realized. However, in 1900, the Ministry of the Interior's Bureau of Shrines and Temples was separated into the Bureau of Shrines and the Bureau of Religious Affairs, and a clear administrative distinction was made between Shinto and other religions. In 1906, the system of preservation money for government shrines and shrines was abolished, and government shrines and shrines were to be paid from the national treasury on a regular basis. 

However, the amount of money to be paid to the shrine was to be kept within the framework of the existing preservation money system, and at the prices of the time, the annual payment was only 210,000 yen, which was about one-tenth of the expenses required to run a shrine of the size of a government-run shrine. In addition, the local government's offering of shibubaku-ryo, which was stipulated for shrines below the prefectural level, was "acceptable" and not mandatory. This did not result in a significant economic gain for the shrine. 

Furthermore, the administration of Shinto shrines by the Shrine Bureau of the Ministry of Home Affairs was also extremely passive. The Ministry of the Interior's Bureau of Shrine Administration was also extremely passive in its administration of Shinto shrines. The Bureau strongly emphasized the precept that "Shinto is a non-religion," and worked to prohibit the expression of Shinto's own religious ideas, while it vigorously restrained the religious activities of Shinto priests, such as funeral rites and missionary activities. He also worked to suppress the debate between Shinto and other religions, arguing that all foreign religions were assimilated into the national spirit and therefore should not be challenged. Based on the above circumstances, Shintoist Chinhiko Ashiizu commented that the main task of the Bureau of Shinto Affairs was to ensure that Shinto was de-ideologized, that the spirit of Shinto was reduced to a vacuum, that the expression of Shinto's original thought was abandoned, and that a compromise with Buddhism, Christianity, and all other legitimate religions was painstakingly made so that the state Shinto system could exist without contradicting the separation of church and state. The Shinto bureau itself was treated as a third-class bureau within the Ministry of Home Affairs, and the bureau chiefs were considered to be waiting for their posts before becoming regional prefectural governors or directors of influential bureaus. 

In 1940, the Shrine Bureau was reorganized into the Shinto Academy, but it was dismantled due to the defeat of the war without effective policies being implemented.

Sectarian Shinto and Zaino-no Shinto Thought 

In this way, the state Shinto system, which abandoned the expression of Shinto thought and created a vacuum of Shinto spirit, was condemned by the local Shinto priests and Shinto thinkers, some of whom developed their own Shinto thought or created private Shinto groups to confront it.

Among those groups, the thirteen schools of Sect Shinto were particularly powerful. These thirteen groups generally include Kurozumikyō Shinto Shusei Jingu-kyo Izumo-taishakyo Fuso-kyo Jikkō kyō Shinshu-kyo Mitake-kyo  Shinto Taikyo Shinrikyo Misogikyo Konkokyo and Tenrikyo. Originally, Jingu-kyo was also included, but later it was reorganized into Jingu Hosaikai and withdrew from sect Shinto. These denominations began to move in the late Tokugawa period on the basis of modern Shinto thought and folk beliefs, and developed in the religious administration of the Meiji era. In 1875, the teaching position of the Ministry of Education was abolished, and as mentioned above, state Shinto came to be separated from its religious aspects based on the theory of Shinto non-religion. In 1875, the Ministry of Education was abolished, and as mentioned above, State Shinto was separated from its religious aspects based on the Secular Shrine Theory. 

In particular, Tenrikyo grew rapidly from the mid-Meiji period and became the denomination with the largest number of followers among the denominational Shinto sects. Tenrikyo began when Miki Nakayama, the founder of Tenrikyo, received a divine blessing in 1838. Miki wrote down the words of God, "Tenri-Oh," which she received through the divine blessing, in a waka-style text called the Ofudesaki, and formed the doctrine. The content of the book is to preach a "joyous life" and emphasize the relationship between husband and wife, and not to emphasize the belief in the house or ancestral spirits. In the creation myth, the Tsukihi Oyasama taught Izanagi, a fish with a human face, and Izanami, a snake, in the muddy sea how to marry, and as a result, humans were born. 

Also important is the emergence of Omoto. Oomoto originated in the year 1892, when Oyasama Nao Deguchi began to speak the words of the Konjin of the Gonon and also began to record the words by his penmanship. Two years later, Onisaburo Deguchi adopted Nao as his son-in-law, and they began to work together. The Oomoto system was established by combining the writing of Ko's pen and the spiritual techniques of Ohnisaburo. Since Kazusaburo Asano, a student at the Naval Engineering School, joined, there has been a succession of intellectuals and military personnel who have joined, and the rapid expansion of the cult has become a social problem. The Daibon teaches the unity of God and man, that God is the creator of all things in this world, that the universal spirit of God dwells in all things in this world, that man is the spiritual head of all things created by God, that God has given him immense wisdom and power in order to put into practice the ideal world that God desires, and that man should understand God's heart from the bottom of his heart, receive God's power, and build the ideal world of mankind through the unity of God and man. Oomoto also had an extremely large impact on the Shinto sects of later generations, giving rise to a series of new religious movements known as "Oomon-kei" and influencing the formation of the Seicho-no-ie. 

As an overall characteristic of the teachings of denominational Shinto, while based on traditional Shinto beliefs, each denomination often had its own main deity and used traditional rituals such as magi nai and divination to propagate their teachings. Although Tenrikyo was recognized by the state, it was often oppressed by the state as it preached its own teachings and gained a large number of followers. Tenrikyo was attacked by the "Secret Instructions" of the Ministry of Home Affairs and was forced to change its rituals. Oomoto was also subjected to the first and second rounds of repression by the government authorities, who were alarmed by the expansion of the number of believers, and destroyed the headquarters facilities, dismantled the entire organization, and detained all the leaders. 

There were also a number of Shinto thinkers who, unlike Shinto denominations and other Shinto groups, were active in their own thought processes. Kawamori Bonji, a Shintoist, criticized the Ministry of the Interior's Shinto policy and argued for the restoration of the Shinto spirit centered on misogi (purification). Influenced by Kawamori, Imaizumi Sadasuke, while conducting empirical research on Shinto since the time of Nobunaga, was initiated into Kawamori, learned religious practices, and expressed his own Shinto philosophy. The idea is that God and human beings are essentially one, and that the truth of the universe is to purify the body and soul through purification, and to manifest the direct spiritual deity, who presides over the unification, to oneself to realize the state of God-human unity. Imaizumi criticized the government's shrine administration and the military's war policy, and gave lectures to politicians urging them to stop the war,、which led to his writings and lecture recordings being banned during the war.

Shinto Directive and Postwar Shinto 
After Japan surrendered at the end of World War II in 1945, the GHQ issued a Shinto directive during the occupation policy and dismantled the state Shinto system.Shinto was declared the root of nationalistic ideology by the GHQ, and in February 1946, all laws related to the administration of Shinto shrines since the Meiji era were abolished. In accordance with the provisions of the Religious Corporation Ordinance enacted in December 1945, Shinto shrines are to be treated as religious corporations in the same way as other religions, and the modern corporate personality system has been abolished. After the lifting of the occupation, the Religious Corporation Order was abolished and the Religious Corporation Law was enacted in 1951. This law set stricter standards for the recognition of religious corporations than the previous Religious Corporation Decree, and shrines throughout Japan became religious corporations in accordance with this law. 

In January 1946, the Institute of Divinities, the Office of Japanese Classics Research, the National Association of Shinto Priests and the Jingūkyō were dissolved and the Association of Shinto Shrines was formed as a shrine organization to encompass all shrines in Japan that were to remain as religious corporations. 

Although the shrines lost their official status, their economic prosperity surpassed that of the prewar period due to the implementation of Shinto funeral rites, which had been prohibited before the war, and the flourishing of various types of prayers. As the Japanese economy improved due to high economic growth, shrines were also upgraded and expanded beyond pre-war levels. On the other hand, as urbanization progressed due to economic growth, problems such as a decrease in the number of Ujiko (shrine parishioners) and a shortage of successors to the Shinto priests became apparent due to the depopulation of rural areas. Urban shrines have also begun to face problems such as the mobility of the Ujiko population, the deterioration of the shrine environment due to urban development, and the increase in the number of nominal Ujiko. 

In the Heisei era (1989-1989), the power spot boom started in the 2000s, and the red seal collecting boom started in the 2010s, resulting in an increase in the number of people visiting shrines. According to a survey conducted by the Jinja Honcho in 2015, only 2% of shrines have an annual income of more than 100 million yen, while about 60% of shrines have an annual income of less than 3 million yen. The number of shrines with an annual income of less than 3 million yen was about 60%. The number of shrines has decreased by about 300 in the past 10 years. For this reason, there have been a number of cases of shrines that have no choice but to rent out part of their premises to turn them into condominiums or other buildings in order to protect the shrine. On the other hand, there are examples of shrines that have managed to overcome their financial difficulties by making various innovations, such as creating original ema (votive picture tablet) and goshuin (red seal), organizing blind dates, and opening cafes as places of relaxation. In addition, there are shrines throughout Japan that are the target of Holy land pilgrimage, in which fans of anime and manga visit the stage of the work, such as Washinomiya Shrine, which has seen an increase in visitors since it became the stage for the anime "Lucky Star" in 2007 (Heisei 19). 

In modern times, shrines play a role in annual events and life rituals for individuals and families, such as Hatsumode, Ogu mairi, Shichi-Go-San, and Wedding. As of 2009, the number of shrine buildings designated as national treasures totaled 27 and 30, and there are many examples of shrine rituals and ceremonies such as the Gion Festival being registered as Important Cultural Property (Japan) for rituals and ceremonies at shrines such as the Gion Festival, and many traditional performing arts such as Yabusame, Gagaku, and Kagura have been preserved. In addition, many shrines, including Meiji Shrine, which has about 100 hectares of forest and about 3,000 species of living organisms in the city, have forests within their precincts, thus playing a role in forest conservation in the city. In 2009 (Heisei 21), the Jinja Honcho participated as a representative of Shinto in the World Assembly for Peace, a gathering of diverse religious figures from around the world, and from the standpoint of Shinto, appealed for the necessity of coexistence between nature and humankind.

References

Bibliography 

 
 
 
 
 
 
 
 
 
 
 
 
 
 
 
 

History of Shinto
Shinto
Pages with unreviewed translations